Frenetic may refer to:

 Frenetic (programming language), a domain-specific language for programming software-defined networks (SDNs)
 The Frenetic Five, a series of interactive fiction ("text adventure") games for a wide variety of platforms
 Frenetic Records, an independent record label

See also
 Frenzy (disambiguation)